The Cochabamba mountain finch (Poospiza garleppi) is a species of bird in the family Thraupidae. It is endemic to shrubby woodland in the Andes of Bolivia. Together with the closely related Tucumán mountain finch, it is placed in the genus Poospiza. It is threatened by habitat loss.

References

Cochabamba mountain finch
Birds of the Bolivian Andes
Endemic birds of Bolivia
Cochabamba mountain finch